Alan Hunter (born 30 July 1964) was an Australian soccer player who played for several National Soccer League (NSL) clubs, most notably for the Brisbane Strikers.

Hunter was born in Northern Ireland. He won the Joe Marston Medal for best afield in the season 1996/97 Grand Final. He also played several games for the Socceroos in 'A' and 'B' international matches.

Honours

Player 
With Parramatta Eagles
 NSL Cup: 1990–91
With Brisbane Strikers
 NSL Championship: 1996–97
Personal honours:
 Under-21 Player of the Year: 1985 with Brisbane Lions SC
Joe Marston Medal: 1996–97 with Brisbane Strikers

References

External links
 Oz Football profile
 NSL awards at ozfootball.net
 Eagles lineup 1990–91 season at ozfootball.net
 Heidelberg United 1986 roster + stats at ozfootball.net
 Brisbane Strikers 91–92 roster + stats at ozfootball.net

1964 births
Living people
Australian soccer players
National Soccer League (Australia) players
Brisbane Strikers FC players
Carlton S.C. players
Sydney United 58 FC players
Sydney United 58 FC managers
Footballers at the 1988 Summer Olympics
Olympic soccer players of Australia
Parramatta FC players
Association football defenders